The Union of Social Democrats (USD) was a political party in Burkina Faso.

History
The UDS was established in November 1990 by Alain Bédouma Yoda, and recognised on 4 April 1991.

The party won a single seat in the 1992 parliamentary elections. On 6 February 1996 it merged into the new Congress for Democracy and Progress.

References

Defunct political parties in Burkina Faso
Political parties established in 1990
Political parties disestablished in 1996
1990 establishments in Burkina Faso
1996 disestablishments in Burkina Faso